Stephen Anthony (Steve) Wilcockson (b Connah's Quay May 1951) is a British retired Anglican priest who served as the Archdeacon of Doncaster from 2012 until 31 December 2019.
 
Wilcockson was educated at  Birkenhead Park High Grammar School for Boys  and  the University of Nottingham. He studied for the priesthood at Wycliffe Hall, Oxford and was ordained in 1976. After curacies in Pudsey and Wandsworth he held incumbencies at  Rock Ferry, Lache-cum-Saltney and [Howell Hill, Surrey[Burgh Heath]]. He was Parish Development Officer for the Diocese of Chester from 2009 to 2012.

References

1951 births
Alumni of the University of Nottingham
Archdeacons of Doncaster
Alumni of Wycliffe Hall, Oxford
Living people
People from Connah's Quay
People educated at Birkenhead Park School